Leucorhynchia tryoni is a species of sea snail, a marine gastropod mollusk in the family Skeneidae.

Distribution
This marine species occurs off Singapore.

References

External links
 To World Register of Marine Species
 Siong Kiat Tan & Henrietta P.M. Woo, A preliminary checklist of the Molluscs of Singapore; Raffles Museum of Biodiversity Research, 2010
 Pilsbry H.A. (1891). A new species of Leucorhynchia. The Nautilus. 5(8): 91

tryoni
Gastropods described in 1891